Sukhaya is a rural locality (a settlement) in Skopkortnenskoye Rural Settlement, Alexandrovsky District, Perm Krai, Russia. The population was 31 as of 2010. There are 7 streets.

Geography 
Sukhaya is located 90 km north of Alexandrovsk (the district's administrative centre) by road. Chikman is the nearest rural locality.

References 

Rural localities in Alexandrovsky District